Black Dynamite is an American adult animated television series based on the 2009 film of the same name, although the series follows a separate continuity, with some back-references to the film. The series was announced shortly after the release of the film, the 10-minute pilot episode was released on Adult Swim Video on August 8, 2011, and the full series premiered on Cartoon Network's late night programming block, Adult Swim, on July 15, 2012. It ended on January 10, 2015 with a total of 20 episodes. Most episodes of the show were rated TV-MA (akin to the R rating of the movie itself) for bloody, stylized violence, strong sexual references (including nudity, references to prostitution, and depictions of sex acts), profanity and humor derived from racism and discrimination.

Michael Jai White, Byron Minns, Tommy Davidson and Kym Whitley reprise their film roles as Black Dynamite, Bullhorn, Cream Corn and Honeybee, respectively. Throughout the first and second seasons, Cedric Yarbrough also reprised his film role as Chocolate Giddy-Up, along with Jimmy Walker Jr. as the restaurant owner Roscoe and Arsenio Hall as Tasty Freeze. It was produced by Ars Nova, Jon Steingart, Carl Jones and Jillian Apfelbaum are executive producers, with Brian Ash as co-executive producer. Scott Sanders, White and Minns are producers. Monica Jones is associate producer. LeSean Thomas is creative producer/supervising director. The original music is by Adrian Younge (who also composed score for the hit film) for season 1 and Fatin "10" Horton for season 2.

Premise
The show, set in the 1970s, is predominantly a parody of and tribute to blaxploitation cinema. The show continues the story of Black Dynamite, Bullhorn, Cream Corn, and Honey Bee as they engage in dangerous and over-the-top misadventures sometimes involving famous celebrities such as Michael Jackson, O. J. Simpson, Bill Cosby, Sidney Poitier, Richard Pryor, Don Cornelius, Dick Clark, Spike Lee, Mr. T, Orphan Arnold, James Brown, Isaac Hayes, Bob Marley, Bo Derek, Rick James, Elvis Presley, Fred Rogers, John Wayne Gacy, J. Edgar Hoover and many others as well as Black Dynamite's recurring nemesis President Richard Nixon, who was also the main villain from the film. The show makes references to the original Black Dynamite film, such as Fiendish Dr. Wu as the leader of a group of ninjas; the show is set before the events of the movie, as some characters from the film who were killed off are alive in the series (notably Bullhorn and Cream Corn). This is reinforced in one episode, where Cream Corn predicts his own future manner of death while in a helicopter.

Voice cast

Main cast
 Michael Jai White as Black Dynamite, Jim Kelly
 Byron Minns as Bullhorn, Rudy Ray Moore, Singer
 Kym Whitley as Honeybee, Old Lady
 Tommy Davidson as Cream Corn, The Boss Man, Red Light

Additional voices
 Carlos Alazraqui as Helicopter Pilot
 Tichina Arnold as Tinbee's Singing Voice
 Erykah Badu as Fatback Taffy, Hoe Crows, Rita Marley, Wolf
 Eric Bauza as The Fiendish Dr. Wu, Chinatown Assassin, R.A.C.I.S.T., Bill Cosby's Assistant, Dick Clark, Newscaster, Child, Reporter
 Liz Benoit as Foxxy Mama
 Tae Brooks as Michael Jackson
 Corey Burton as Dennis Flynn, Mr. Rogers, Phil Drummond
 Chance the Rapper as Bob Marley
 Michael Colyar as
 Affion Crockett as Joe Jackson
 DeRay Davis as Ninja, Isaac Layes, Ringo Mandingo
 John DiMaggio as Rip Tayles, Female Cop, J. Edgar Hoover, Rump Rangers Human Horse, Various Gay People
 Godfrey as Al Sharpton
 David Alan Grier as The Doctor
 Eddie Griffin as Richard Pryor, Paul Mooney
 Arsenio Hall as Tasty Freeze
 Samuel L. Jackson as Captain Quinton
 Carl Jones as Frank the John, Crenshaw Pete, Puppet Minion, Shark Victim, Stewie Fig Newton, Announcer, The Mayor of Beach City, Teacher, Laughing Prisoner
 Orlando Jones as Basehead, Flying Junkies, Stewie's Brother, James Brown
 Rochelle Jordan as Cindy Breakspeare
 Sean Kingston as Dexter, Saint
 Jonathan Kite as Richard Nixon, Henry Kissinger, James Bonds (Sean Connery and Roger Moore), News Reporter, Elvis Presley
 Phil LaMarr as Muhammad Ali
 Lil' Mo as Offscreen Nurse, Teacher, Rondell's Mom
 Luenell as Moms Mabley
 Mel B as Connie Lingus
 Hugh Moore as Pimp
 Charlie Murphy as A Cat Named Rollo, A Slave Cat Named Rollo
 Tim Blake Nelson as Chief Humphrey McGillihorn, The Wicked Bitch of the West Side, Donald Sterling, Television Executive, Cracker Cop, Director
 Georgette Perna as Kids
 Clifton Powell as Crenshaw the Slime, Daddy Dynamite
 Donnell Rawlings as A Cat Named Rallo, A Slave Cat Named Rallo
 Christopher "Kid" Reid as John the John, Sun Tzu, Black Lucky, Jamaica Labour Party Member
 Kevin Michael Richardson as Melvin Van Peebles, Don Cornelius, Bill Cosby, Fred Berry
 Eddie Rouse as Spike Lee
 J. B. Smoove as That Frog Kurtis, That Bastard Kurtis
 Snoop Dogg as Leroy Van Nuys
 Aries Spears as Mr. T, O. J. Simpson
 Cree Summer as Li'l Orphan Willis
 Tiffany Thomas as Li'l Orphan Dudley
 Greg Travis as Ku Klux Klan Wizard
 Tyler, the Creator as Broto
 Waka Flocka Flame as Waka Blocka Blaow
 Jason Walden as Dennis Flynn
 Tionne "T-Boz" Watkins as Pam Grier, Reverse Strip Club Owner
 Billy West as MASA Scientist
 Denzel Whitaker as Donald the Accountant, Jermaine Jackson
 Dennis L. A. White as Arnold's Stomach
 Gary Anthony Williams as George Washington Carver III, Radio DJ, Reporter, Howard Cosell
 Debra Wilson as Amazon Moon Bitch Leader, Lil' Orphan Penny, Eartha K.I.T.T., Euphoria, Li'l Orphan Arnold, Li'l Orphan Rodney King, Li'l Rodney Munchkins, Givinya Morehead, Child Services Lady, Hotel Employee, Hoe Crows
 Cedric Yarbrough as Chocolate Giddy-Up

Episodes

Pilot (2011)
The pilot episode features only an eleven-minute run time and was released on Adult Swim Video on August 8, 2011, and made its television debut over a year later on September 2, 2012.

Season 1 (2012)

Season 2 (2014–15)

See also
 Black Dynamite

References

External links
 
 
 

Black Dynamite
2010s American adult animated television series
2010s American animated comedy television series
2010s American black cartoons
2010s American crime television series
2010s American parody television series
2012 American television series debuts
2015 American television series endings
American adult animated action television series
American adult animated comedy television series
American flash adult animated television series
Anime-influenced animation
Anime-influenced Western animation
Anime-influenced Western animated television series
English-language television shows
Adult Swim original programming
Animated television shows based on films
Martial arts television series
Television series set in the 1970s
Television series by Williams Street
Television shows about crime